Inter-county cricket matches are known to have been played since the early 18th century, involving teams that are representative of the historic counties of England and Wales. Since the late 19th century, there have been two county championship competitions played at different levels: the County Championship, a first-class competition which involves eighteen first-class county clubs among which seventeen are English and one is from Wales; and the National Counties Championship, which involves nineteen English county clubs and one club that represents several Welsh counties.

History
County cricket started in the eighteenth century, the earliest known inter-county match being played in 1709, though an official County Championship was not instituted until 1890.

Development of county cricket
Inter-county cricket was popular throughout the 18th century, although the best teams, such as Kent in the 1740s or Hampshire in the days of the famous Hambledon Club, were usually acknowledged as such by being matched against All-England. The most successful county teams were Hampshire, Kent, Middlesex, Surrey and Sussex. There was, however, often a crossover between town and county with some strong local clubs tending at times to represent a whole county. Examples are London, which often played against county teams and was in some respects almost a county club in itself; Slindon, which was for a few years in the 1740s effectively representative of Sussex as a county; Dartford, sometimes representative of Kent; and the Hambledon Club, certainly representative of Hampshire and also perhaps of Sussex. One of the best county teams in the late 18th century was Berkshire, which no longer has first-class status.

Modern county cricket
All matches prior to 1988 were scheduled for three days, normally of a nominal six hours each plus intervals, but often with the first two days lengthened by up to an hour and the final day shortened, so that teams with fixtures elsewhere on the following day could travel at sensible hours. The exception to this was the 1919 season, when there was an experiment with two-day matches played over longer hours, up to nine o'clock in the evening in mid-summer. This experiment was not repeated. From 1988 to 1992 some matches were played over four days. From 1993 onward, all matches have been scheduled for four days.

Teams

First-class counties

The eighteen first-class counties are the top league cricket teams. They are named after historic English counties and include one Welsh county.

The first-class counties are:

The full name of each club is the name of the county followed by the words County Cricket Club, often abbreviated as CCC.

Other teams with first-class status

MCC 
The opening first-class game of an English county cricket season has traditionally been played at Lord's between the MCC and the Champion County (the club that won the County Championship the previous year). When the Marylebone Cricket Club (MCC) plays against one of the first-class counties, the game is granted first-class status.

MCC Universities 
The six MCC-sponsored University (MCCU) teams, were until 2020 also afforded first-class status for some of their matches against a first-class county. They were:

Cambridge University (1827–2020)
Oxford University (1827–2020)
Cambridge MCCU (2001–2019)
Oxford MCCU (2001–2019)
Durham MCCU (2001–2019)
Loughborough MCCU (2003–2019)
Cardiff MCCU (2012–2019)
Leeds/Bradford MCCU (2012–2019)

Most of the first-class counties play three-day games against university cricket teams in the early part of the English cricket season. This is partly because the start of the cricket season coincides with the end of the university academic year, and partly because the games act as pre-season warm-ups for the county clubs.

National counties

The National Counties, known prior to 2020 as the Minor Counties, are the cricketing counties of England that are not afforded first-class status.  A further team represents the counties of Wales other than Glamorgan. Present members are:

Eastern Division
Bedfordshire 
Buckinghamshire 
Cambridgeshire 
Cumberland 
Hertfordshire 
Lincolnshire 
Norfolk 
Northumberland 
Staffordshire 
Suffolk 

Western Division
Berkshire 
Cheshire 
Cornwall 
Devon 
Dorset 
Herefordshire 
Oxfordshire 
Shropshire 
Wales 
Wiltshire

Other teams
Some teams outside of the English counties have been allowed to take part in some English county cricket one-day competitions. They include:

 Unicorns

There are no representative teams carrying the names of the historic counties of Westmorland, Rutland, and Huntingdonshire.

Qualification rules
An important year was 1873, when player qualification rules came into force, requiring players to choose at the start of each season whether they would play for the county of their birth or their county of residence. Before this, it was quite common for a player to play for both counties during the course of a single season. Three meetings were held, and at the last of these, held at The Oval on 9 June 1873, the following rules were decided on:

Competitions

First-class cricket

The County Championship is the domestic first-class cricket competition in England and Wales. The tournament currently has a two-division format with ten counties in Division One and eight in Division Two.

One-day cricket
The Royal London One-Day Cup is a 50 over one-day cricket competition in county cricket. The 18 English county sides are divided randomly into two groups of nine with each team playing each other once. The top four in each group reach the quarter-finals. The competition culminates at Lord's for the final. The Royal London One Day Cup replaced the Yorkshire Bank 40 over League. The first winners of the competition were Durham in 2014.

Twenty20 cricket
The Twenty20 Cup is the top Twenty20 cricket competition contested by the eighteen first-class counties. The games are limited to 20 overs per side, and the emphasis is on fast action. From 2018, the competition is called Vitality Blast for sponsorship reasons.

National counties cricket

The competitions of national counties cricket are the National Counties Cricket Championship and the NCCA Knockout Trophy.

Women's County Cricket
The Women's County Championship is played each year, in a similar manner to the men's, but the Women's county game focuses upon 50 over cricket. There is also the Women's Cricket Super League, a T20 competition. Some counties are involved, and feature in a divisional structure. Promotion and relegation is a feature throughout.

References

Forms of cricket
English domestic cricket competitions